Shumai is a type of traditional Chinese dumpling. In Cantonese cuisine, it is usually served as a dim sum snack. In addition to accompanying the Chinese diaspora, a variation of shumai also appears in Japan as (shūmai) and various southeast Asian countries.

Popular Chinese varieties

Hohhot shaomai
Hohhot shaomai is a regional variety in Hohhot, Inner Mongolia.

The wrapping is a very thin, round sheet of unleavened dough, with a pleat border.  There is only one kind of filling, which mainly consists of chopped or minced mutton, scallion and ginger. Hohhot shaomai features this extensive use of scallion and ginger, creating a dense combined scent, and a slightly spicy taste. The filling is put in the center of the wrapping and the border of the wrapping is loosely gathered above, forming a "neck" and a flower shaped top. It is then cooked by steaming or pan-frying. Hohhot shaomai is served in the unit of "liang", which means either eight steamed ones served in a steamer tier, or eight fried ones served in a dish. "Liang" is equal to 50 grams, being traditionally used as an indication of the total weight of the wrapping. Hohhot shaomai is commonly served with vinegar and tea, due to its greasiness.

Cantonese siumaai 

This is the most well-known variety outside of Asia and is from the southern provinces of Guangdong and Guangxi. As prepared in Cantonese cuisine, siumaai is also referred to as "pork and mushroom dumpling". Its standard filling consists primarily of ground pork, small whole or chopped shrimp, Chinese black mushroom, green onion (also called scallion) and ginger with seasonings of Chinese rice wine (e.g. Shaoxing rice wine), soy sauce, sesame oil and chicken stock. Bamboo shoots, water chestnuts and pepper can also be added. The outer covering is made of a thin sheet of lye water dough, which is either yellow or white. The center is usually garnished with an orange dot, made of crab roe or diced carrot, although a green dot made with a pea may be used. The decorative presentations vary.

A fish paste variety of siumaai is sold as a popular street food in Hong Kong, usually alongside curry fishballs. It is most often eaten with a sweet soy sauce and/or chili oil.

The Hong Kong Siumaipedia was written to document the Cantonese variety.

Hunan juhua shaomai
Called the chrysanthemum shaomai, this variety is made in Changsha, Hunan province. This shaomai is named for its opening resembling the chrysanthemum flower petal shape. It is spicy with pepper and the wrapper is translucent. The filling largely consists of glutinous rice, pork hash, shrimp, shiitake mushrooms bamboo shoots and onion.

Jiangnan shaomai
Shaomai prepared in the Jiangnan region (stretching from Shanghai to Nanjing) has a filling similar to zongzi from the region, containing marinated pork pieces in glutinous rice,  soy sauce and Shaoxing wine, steamed with pork fat. It is larger in size than the Cantonese version.

The Shanghai variation also contains shiitake mushrooms and onion. The mince, mushrooms and onion are stir-fried before being prepared as the filling.

Uyghur shaomai
In northwest China, the Uyghur people of Xinjiang adapted shaomai into two regional varieties. The southern Xinjiang recipes differ slightly from the northern version in terms of ingredients and method. The filling of the northern version consists of mutton or beef, along with green onion and radish, whereas the southern filling primarily uses glutinous rice with smaller amounts of mutton or beef. Minced meat from sheep ribs containing some fat is ideal.

Jiangxi Yifeng shaomai
Called the Yifeng shaomai in the southeastern Jiangxi province, this version's distinct flavour comes from a blend of pork mince, bread flour, sesame seed powder, ground pepper and sugar. It is particularly popular in the area of Yifeng Tanshan Tianbao where it is one of the foods eaten during the Chinese New Year celebration.

Variants from other countries

Japanese shūmai
Shūmai in Japan usually use pork and minced onion as the main ingredients and are usually topped with a green pea. Compared to Chinese shaomai in which the meat filling is usually minced, the meat in Japanese shumai is ground to a paste.

Indonesian siomay

Siomay or siomai (sometimes called somay) in Indonesia is pronounced the same way as its sisters and is usually a wonton wrapper, stuffed with filling and steamed. It is served also with steamed potatoes, tofu, hard-boiled eggs, steamed bitter gourd and cabbages, all  sliced and topped with peanut sauce and kecap manis (sweet soy sauce). Because the population of Indonesia is largely Muslim, pork siomay is rare and is usually made from various fish, most commonly wahoo or mackerel tuna. This variant is less common in Western countries.

Philippine siomai

Siomai in the Philippines is often ground pork, beef, shrimp, and the like. It is combined with extenders like garlic, green peas, carrots and among others which is then wrapped in wonton wrappers. It is commonly steamed, with a popular variant being fried and resulting in a crisp exterior. It is normally dipped in soy sauce with the juice of calamansi, a Philippine lime, and a chili-garlic oil is sometimes added to the sauce.

A recent variant on siomai is wrapped in sheets of laver after the wonton wrappers, which are marketed as "Japanese".

Vietnamese xíu mại
Xíu mại in Vietnam has minced pork, onion, scallion and shredded bread as the main ingredients and is cooked in tomato sauce. It is usually served in a roll of bánh mì for breakfast. Because the recipe omits dough wrappings, it is more akin to a meatball rather than shumai.

History
As described by historical materials, shaomai was served in tea houses as a secondary product. The name "", means the product was "sold as a sideline", with tea. It is considered to have been brought to Beijing and Tianjin by merchants from Shanxi, causing its later wide spread. The name was later transformed into modern forms like "; ", "" and "; ", changing the characters while keeping the original pronunciation. The product was initially in the form of meat and vegetables wrapped in thin sheets, and was sold weighing only the wrapper, a tradition which is still kept in Huhhot.

Serving

In Huhhot, shaomai is commonly served as a staple food, especially for breakfast. It is considered a local specialty in regions around Huhhot. Steamed shaomai are served in steam tiers, and fried shaomai are served in dishes.

Within the dim sum tradition of southern China, shaomai is one of the most standard dishes. It is generally served alongside har gow, another variety of steamed dumpling containing shrimp, cooked pork fat, bamboo shoots and scallions; collectively these are known as har gow-siu mai.

In Guangzhou, siu mai (燒賣) and har gow (蝦餃), along with char siu bao (叉燒包), and egg tarts (蛋撻), are considered the classic dishes of Cantonese dim sum cuisine. They are collectively referred to as the "Four Heavenly Kings" of the cuisine..

In food stalls in Indonesia, siomai (or "siomay" in local dialect) are eaten together with steamed vegetables and tofu, and served with spicy peanut sauce.

In Philippine food stalls and fast food restaurants, siomai is eaten with dip, toothpicks to facilitate handling, or with rice (using a spoon and fork).

See also
 Har gow
 Siomay

References

Cantonese cuisine
Chinese words and phrases
Dim sum
Dumplings
Hong Kong cuisine
Shanghai cuisine
Philippine cuisine
Indonesian cuisine
Thai cuisine
Vietnamese cuisine